Born in the Lekié region of Cameroon in 1965, Sally Nyolo left her homeland at the age of 13 to settle in Paris where she has lived since. Nyolo started her professional career in 1982, first as a backup-singer working with numerous French and African artists, and by composing music for radio and cinema.

In 1993, Nyolo joined the Belgian a cappella group Zap Mama for their world tour. With Zap Mama she recorded the album Sabsylma, and two live records (in Japan, and at Montreux).

In 1996, Nyolo recorded her first solo album, entitled Tribu (Tribe), published by the Lusafrica Label. The album, awarded by Radio France Internationale in 1997, became a worldwide success, selling 300,000 copies.

After several other albums - Multiculti (1998), Beti (2000), Zaione (2002) - Nyolo finally returned to her native Cameroon, where she set up a studio, with the intention to explore and develop the local music scene. "I intend to sell the Cameroonian culture abroad by creating an international music association which will link young Cameroonian musicians to other artists around the world, " she said. This effort resulted in the album Studio Cameroon, published in 2006 by World Music Network.

In 2014, Nyolo collaborated with COPILOT Music and Sound on a cover of Carlinhos Brown's "Maria Caipirnha (Samba da Bahia)”.  The arrangement represented the musical instrumentation and styles of Cameroon for Visa's "Samba of the World", a digital campaign for the 2014 FIFA World Cup.

Nyolo sings in French, Arabic, English, Spanish, and her native Eton. In her music, she mixes styles and rhythms, fusing forest sounds with urban beats. The Boston Herald stated, "Nyolo has gone out of her way to blend West Africa with cosmopolitan Paris."

Discography 

Solo albums
 Tribu (1996)
 Multiculti (1998)
 Beti (2000)
 Zaione (2002)
 Studio Cameroon (2006)
 Memoire du Monde (2007)
 La Nuit a Febe (2011)
  Tiger Run (2014)

Contributing artist
 The Rough Guide to Acoustic Africa (2013, World Music Network)

Weblinks 
 Homepage of Sally Nyolo
 Biography of Sally Nyolo, African Success, 11 September 2011
 Discogs entry

References

 Young, Bob. "Singer is making her future with languages of her past." Boston Herald, 21 August 1998 
 Opposing Viewpoints in Context. Web. 3 Nov. 2014

Living people
Cameroonian emigrants to France
21st-century Cameroonian women singers
1965 births
20th-century Cameroonian women singers